Hisarin Castle ( also known as Hisarkale where Hisar means "fort") is a castle ruin in Mersin Province, Turkey.

Geography
The castle is in the rural area of Erdemli district. Although its birds flight distance to the highway   which connects Mersin to Antalya is about  there is no direct road to the castle and the castle can be reached by foot through bushy terrain from the village road between Ayaş  and Esenpınar.

History
The history of the castle has not been firmly established. But the polygonal masonry suggests ancient age. (Seleucid Empire or Roman Empire era). The castle was used as a garrison to protect the ancient city to the east of the valley.

The building
The double layer rampart was built by polygonal masonry. The inner side of rampart was supported by backing-walls. There are some compartments to the north which are thought to be workshops of the castle and there are three mausoleums to the north east. There are a number of graves and some rooms to the south of the castle. One important element of the castle is a Heracles figuration on the wall which was a symbol of Olba Kingdom, a vassal of the Seleucid Empire.

References

Erdemli District
Ruined castles in Turkey
Castles in Mersin Province
Archaeological sites in Mersin Province, Turkey
Olba territorium